Charlotte Mary Rose Cheverton (16 January 1960 – 17 September 1991)  was a British artist. She and her husband Mark founded the Leith School of Art in 1988. She was also known as Lottie.

Early life and education 
Cheverton was born on 16 January 1960 in Ripon, Yorkshire. She was the youngest child of Juliet Ponsonby and the Rt Hon James Ramsden MP. She was educated in London and then at Marlborough College, where she was inspired to study art by Robin Child.

At the Slade School of Art (1978–91) she received a travelling scholarship to study Christian iconography in Cappadocia, an experience which influenced her later work.

Career 
Cheverton taught at Fettes College and worked with community groups, in 1985 persuading artists from all over Scotland to donate pictures for display in aid of developing countries in an Art for Africa Appeal.

In 1988 she and her husband, Mark, founded the Leith School of Art to offer an environment for creativity, personal growth and intellectual awareness.

Cheverton was known in Scottish art circles for her sculptural still lives. Her works, both religious and later of fishermen and ladders of the Leith Dockyards, showed an interest in people and their lives. Both Mark and Charlotte were committed Christians and their last year of teaching was centred around the meaning of the Crucifixion.

The pamphlet Freedom within a framework: The art and teaching of Mark and Charlotte Cheverton, described an exhibition held at Leith School of Art in 1992.

Personal life 
She married Mark Cheverton, artist and teacher, who was appointed head of art at Edinburgh Academy.

Death and memorial 
Cheverton and her husband both died in a road accident on 17 September 1991.

A tapestry by Carol Marples in memory of Charlotte Cheverton is on display at St Paul's and St George's Church in Edinburgh.

References 

1960 births
1991 deaths
20th-century English women artists
Alumni of the Slade School of Fine Art
People educated at Marlborough College
People from Ripon
Road incident deaths in the United Kingdom